Artemisia thuscula (Incienso) is a species endemic to the Canary Islands. It is frequent in dry areas at lower elevations (50–700 m). Its capitula are globose and leaf lobes flat.

References 

thuscula
Plants described in 1801
Flora of the Canary Islands
Taxa named by Antonio José Cavanilles